Arto Halonen (born 11 January 1964, Joensuu) is a documentary filmmaker from Finland. He was also a teacher of cinematography in Joensuu between 1986-1989.

In 2008, China did not give a visa to Arto Halonen to participate 2008 Summer Olympics. Halonen was an official guest selected by the Finnish Olympic Committee. China gave no explanation. Halonen made in 1998 a documentary about Tibet: Karmapa.

Shadow of the Holy Book;  is a documentary about Turkmenistan, Ruhnama and business of companies in Turkmenistan, having large gas and oil resources, e.g. Bouygues and Siemens.

Filmography

Director
Karmapa (1998)
The Stars Caravan (2000)
The Tank Man (2004)
Conquistadors of Cuba (2005)
Pavlov's Dogs (2006)
Shadow of the Holy Book (2007)
The Magnetic Man (2009)
Princess (2010)
When Heroes Lie (2012)
A Patriotic Man (2013)
Murderous Trance (2019)

References

External links

News about Halonen's denial of a Chinese visa

1964 births
Living people
Finnish documentary filmmakers
Finnish film directors